St Matthew's Church is a  Grade I listed parish church in the Church of England in Pentrich, Derbyshire.

History

The church dates from the 12th century. It comprises a nave, north and south aisles, a porch, chancel and short embattled tower. It was restored between 1859 and 1860. It reopened on 28 March 1860.

The font stands on a pedestal dated 1662 but the bowl has decoration typical of the Norman period. During the 19th century the bowl was absent and was used for the salting of beef.

On the exterior of the south chancel wall is a scratch dial or mass clock.

Stained glass
South aisle east end, Morris & Co.
Chancel north wall. Christopher Whall 1915

Memorials
Edward Horn (d. 1764)
Madam Mower (d. 1776)

Organ

The pipe organ dates from 1860 and was built by Forster and Andrews. A specification of the organ can be found on the National Pipe Organ Register.

See also
Grade I listed churches in Derbyshire
Grade I listed buildings in Derbyshire
Listed buildings in Pentrich

References

Church of England church buildings in Derbyshire
Grade I listed churches in Derbyshire